Kazakhstan–Ukraine relations are foreign relations between Kazakhstan and Ukraine. Before 1918, both countries were part of the Russian Empire and until 1991 they were part of the USSR. Both countries established diplomatic relations in 1991. Kazakhstan has an embassy in Kyiv and an honorary consulate in Odesa. Ukraine has an embassy in Astana and a consulate-general in Almaty. There are between 895,000 and 2,400,000 ethnic Ukrainians living in Kazakhstan. Both countries are full members of TRACECA, of the Baku Initiative, of the Euro-Atlantic Partnership Council, Partnership for Peace and of the Organization for Security and Co-operation in Europe.

History
On 14 October 2013, Foreign Minister Erlan Idrisov met with Ukrainian Foreign Minister Leonid Kozhara. The two discussed furthering bilateral cooperation amongst the two nations. Also, Ukraine holds the seat for the Organization for Security and Cooperation in Europe (OSCE) and shared what they can learn from Kazakhstan when they held the seat in 2010. Finally, Minister Kozhara announced Ukraine's President Viktor Yanukovych would visit in 2014.

Post-Maidan and Russo-Ukrainian War
Yanukovych was overthrown as Ukraine's leader in 2014. Although Kazakh ally Russia vehemently opposed the post-revolutionary government in Kyiv, Astana has maintained its own ties despite the change in power.

Tokayev presidency
On 4 December 2019, on the eve of a state visit to Germany, he gave an interview to Deutsche Welle, in which he drew controversy in Ukraine by saying that he did not believe that the Annexation of Crimea by the Russian Federation was an invasion while also saying that he believed in the "wisdom of the Russian leadership", drawing condemnation from the Ukrainian Ministry of Foreign Affairs, who issued a demarche in response. After the Russian Invasion of Ukraine in early 2022, representatives of the Kazakh leadership, including President Kassym-Jomart Tokayev and Foreign Minister Mukhtar Tleuberdi condemned the invasion and refused to recognize the Donetsk People's Republic and Luhansk People's Republic. Since the war, the government has participated in sending aid to Ukraine.

Ukraine praised Tokayev’s statements at the St. Petersburg International Economic Forum, where he stated that Kazakhstan would not recognize “quasi-state entities” that were the DPR and LPR.

On August 21, 2022 Ukrainian ambassador to Kazakhstan Petro Vrublevskiy gave an interview to a Kazakhstani blogger Dias Kuzairov, in which he commented on Russian invasion of Ukraine, saying "the more Russians we kill now, the fewer of them our children will have to kill in the future." Soon after, Vrublevskiy was summoned by Kazakhstan's Foreign Ministry, which deemed these words as "inappropriate for the activities of the ambassador." He had been dismissed on October 18, 2022 by President of Ukraine, Volodymyr Zelenskyy.

Trade
Bilateral trade in 2012 between the two countries is according to officials more than doubled compared with 2010 and reached $4.4 billion.

See also
Foreign relations of Kazakhstan
Foreign relations of Ukraine
Ukrainians in Kazakhstan

References

External links
Kazakh embassy in Kyiv
Ukrainian embassy in Astana

 

 
Ukraine
Kazakhstan